Sigritsa Point (Nos Sigritsa \'nos si-'gri-tsa\) is an ice-free point on the northeast coast of Varna Peninsula, Livingston Island in the South Shetland Islands, Antarctica forming the northwest side of the entrance to Dragon Cove.  The area was visited by 19th century sealers.

The feature is named after Teodor Sigritsa, Kavhan (hereditary viceroy function) under the Bulgarian ruler Czar Simeon the Great (9-10th century AD).

Location
British mapping in 1968, Bulgarian in 2005 and 2009.

Maps
 L.L. Ivanov et al. Antarctica: Livingston Island and Greenwich Island, South Shetland Islands. Scale 1:100000 topographic map. Sofia: Antarctic Place-names Commission of Bulgaria, 2005.
 L.L. Ivanov. Antarctica: Livingston Island and Greenwich, Robert, Snow and Smith Islands. Scale 1:120000 topographic map.  Troyan: Manfred Wörner Foundation, 2009.

References
 Sigritsa Point. SCAR Composite Gazetteer of Antarctica.
 Bulgarian Antarctic Gazetteer. Antarctic Place-names Commission. (details in Bulgarian, basic data in English)

External links
 Sigritsa Point. Copernix satellite image

Headlands of Livingston Island
Bulgaria and the Antarctic